Alota is one of the cantons of the Enrique Baldivieso Province (or "San Agustín Municipality") in the Potosí Department in south-west Bolivia. During the census of 2001 it had 533 inhabitants.  Its seat is Alota with a population of 515 in 2001.

References

External links
 San Agustín Municipality (= Enrique Baldivieso Province): population data and map 

Cantons of Potosí Department
Cantons of Bolivia